Dolores M. Mertz (born May 30, 1928) was the Iowa State Representative from the 8th District. She served in the Iowa House of Representatives from 1989 through 2011.

Born in Bancroft, Iowa to  John and Gertrude (née Erickson) Shay, she earned her AA from Briar Cliff College (now Briar Cliff University).

Mertz served on several committees in the Iowa House – the Judiciary committee; the Natural Resources committee; the Transportation committee; and the Agriculture committee, where she is chair. She also serves on the Agriculture and Natural Resources Appropriations Subcommittee. Her political experience includes twenty-five years as Democrat precinct leader and 13 years on the Kossuth County Central Committee. Mertz was re-elected in 2006 with 8,142 votes, running unopposed.

She is the former co-chairperson, currently "Chairman Emeritus" on the board of directors of the American Legislative Exchange Council (ALEC), a national association of legislators.

References

External links
 Financial information (state office) at the National Institute for Money in State Politics
 

Democratic Party members of the Iowa House of Representatives
Living people
Briar Cliff University alumni
Women state legislators in Iowa
1928 births
People from Kossuth County, Iowa
People from Humboldt County, Iowa
21st-century American women